Cambio de Piel may refer to:

Music
Cambio de Piel (Alejandra Guzmán album), 1996
Cambio de Piel (Bebe album), 2015
Cambio de Piel (Denise Rosenthal album) or the title song, 2017
Cambio de Piel, an album Myriam Montemayor Cruz, 2008
"Cambio de Piel" (song), by Marc Anthony, 2013

Other uses
Cambio de piel (novel), or A Change of Skin, a 1967 novel by Carlos Fuentes
Cambio de piel (TV series), a 1997 Venezuelan telenovela